Cyrtodactylus tuberculatus is a species of gecko that is endemic to Queensland in Australia.

References 

Cyrtodactylus
Reptiles described in 1900